Ugoki or Ugoke (اگوکی) is a town in the Sialkot District on the Sialkot-Wazirabad Dual Carriageway with the Hussain Mall being the top-most building of the town. There is also a railway station called Ugoke railway station. The Sialkot International Airport is located about 14 km from the town, whereas the center of Sialkot is just 10 km away to the east. 

The town has its own union council and being the second largest cooperative house building society covering almost 50 percent of the town area. The town is the main hub of medical surgical instruments manufacturing market.   
Veerum is a village which is located near this town. 

 It is  famous for a pro Islamic saint namely, Baba Mulik Wali Shah, and its Urs or Mela.

References

Cities and towns in Sialkot District